The Busira River is a river in the Democratic Republic of the Congo. It is the main tributary of the Ruki River, which in turn is a tributary of the Congo River. 
The Busira may be seen as the upper reach of the Ruki River. It is navigable year round.

Location

The Busira River forms a few miles west of Boende where the Lomela River joins the Tshuapa River from the left.
The Momboyo River joins the Busira River from the left to form the Ruki River above Ingende.

High water is in March-April and November.
Low water is in February and June-July. 
Villages along the Busira River include Lingunda, Boleke, Bokote and Loolo.
These have markets for wild animals and for forest products from the nearby Salonga National Park.
They are the main source of bushmeat in the markets of Mbandaka, where the Ruki River joins the Congo River.

Environment

The Busira forms in the heart of the central depression of the Congo Basin.
Rainfall here averages  annually, with no dry season.
The Tshuapa and Lomela tributaries both run through wide belts of swampland.
There are swamps on the Busira and Momboyo before they join to form the Ruki.
Swamps cover  on the Busira between 19°00'E and 19°27'E.
The Busira River feeds the Mbandaka flooded forests, and floods .

Edaphic savannas, small herbaceous clearings on sandy, or loamy to clayey soil, are found beside the channels of the Busira River.
They are separated from the river by a strip of gallery forest.
They form on old sandbanks or dried out lagoons left behind when the river changed course.
The vegetation is dominated by Hyparrhenia diplandra.
The savannas are transitional and gradually disappear as they are invaded by the forest.

Colonial period

As of 1 January 1894 the Société anonyme belge pour le commerce du Haut-Congo (SAB) had 83 factories and posts, including some in the French territory to the west of the Congo and Ubangi rivers.
A map shows the company had posts along the upper Ruki River at Bilakamba, Bombimba, Bussira Manene, Moniaca, Bocoté and Yolongo. It also had a post at Bomputu on the Lengué (Salonga) River, and posts at Balalondzy, Ivulu and Ivuku on the Momboyo River.

The Compagnie du Congo pour le Commerce et l'Industrie (CCCI) was given the right to 1 of land in return for its services in studying the Matadi-Léopoldville Railway project.
The CCCI and CFC lands were mostly grouped into the Bloc de la Busira-Momboyo, created in 1901, along the Busira and Momboyo rivers.
In 1904, in the last months before the concession was taken back by the state, the SAB harvested 50 tons of dry rubber, of which 6 were from Ikelemba, 34 from Busira and 10 from Salonga Lomela.

Notes

Sources

Rivers of the Democratic Republic of the Congo